Abubakar Khan (born 15 May 1993) is a Pakistani cricketer. He made his first-class debut for Sui Northern Gas Pipelines Limited in the 2013–14 Quaid-e-Azam Trophy on 29 December 2013.

References

External links
 

1993 births
Living people
Pakistani cricketers
Sui Northern Gas Pipelines Limited cricketers
Cricketers from Mianwali